Piper capense is a species of pepper in the genus Piper.  A relative of black pepper (Piper Nigrum), its berries are used as a spice called African long pepper, Ethiopian long pepper, or timiz.

References

capense